The 10/- banknote was first issued on 1 May 1913 as a blue banknote payable in gold. It was equal to a half sovereign gold coin. The sizes varied but the design was the same for the following issues: 1913–1914 issue was 194×83mm, 1915–1923 197×88 mm, 1923–1933 180×78mm. This issue was payable in gold but subsequent issues were legal tender.

The 1913 note was the world's first officially issued ten-shilling note.  The first note, serial number M000001, was printed by Judith Denman, five-year-old daughter of the Governor-General of Australia, Lord Denman.

The last banknote issue had a print of 557,548,000 banknotes.

The ten-shilling note was equivalent to one dollar upon decimalisation in 1966.

Signature combinations
James Collins and George Allen (1913, 1915)John Cerutty and James Collins (1918)Denison Miller and James Collins (1923)Kell and James Collins (1926)Kell and James Heathershaw (1927)Ernest Riddle and James Heathershaw (1928)Ernest Riddle and Harry Sheehan (1933, 1934, 1936)Harry Sheehan and Stuart McFarlane (1939)Hugh Armitage and Stuart McFarlane (1942)H.C. Coombs and George Watt (1949)H.C. Coombs and Roland Wilson (1952, 1954, 1961)

See also

 Banknotes of the Australian pound

References

External links
Reserve Bank of Australia

Banknotes of Australia
1913 establishments in Australia
1966 disestablishments in Australia